The 1896–97 season was Burslem Port Vale's first season of football (third overall) back in the Midland League following a four season stay in the Football League. The first half of the season saw low crowds and poor results, the consequence of which led to discussions about dissolving the club. However, the club returned from the brink, as a new committee was formed, with Edward Oliver installed as chairman and Sam Gleaves appointed club secretary. Good results and large crowds followed in the second half of the campaign, and the club finished in seventh-place and narrowly missed out on re-election to the Football League. Vale were beaten by Football League opposition in the fifth qualification round in the FA Cup, whilst exiting the Birmingham Senior Cup, Staffordshire Senior Cup and Wellingborough Cup in the early stages, though they did beat Football League side Walsall in the latter competition. They won the Staffordshire Senior Charity Cup after beating Dresden United 3–0.

Overview

Midland League
Having failed a vote to stay in the Football League, Burslem Port Vale successfully re-applied for membership of the Midland League. They started positively with a 4–1 home win over Wellingborough Town, though only 200 spectators turned up to the Athletic Ground. Bad news followed as centre-half Ralph Barlow suffered a breakdown and was sent to a convalescent home. The team then lost home and away to Glossop North End, with Danny Simpson being sent off in the home fixture for making an "objectionable remark" to the referee. A 1–0 defeat at Worksop was followed by a 5–2 win over a strong Doncaster Rovers side. Wellingborough Town then took their revenge with a 3–2 win in Wellingborough. Feeling the need to raise funds, Vale sold goalkeeper Tom Baddeley to Wolverhampton Wanderers for £50. The financial boost was needed as a 3–1 home win over Barnsley St Peter's on 7 November saw just 100 spectators, raising gross takings of £5 for a match-day loss of around £8. In Baddeley's absence Vale conceded six in a home defeat to Rushden and "the disgust of the spectators was general". A public meeting was held on 14 December to debate the club's future, if any; the outlook seemed extremely bleak as a poorly attended meeting heard that the club had a debt of £110 and the current committee were unwilling to continue funding the club.

Heanor Town lent Vale the necessary £5 expenses for the trip to Heanor and the home side subsequently romped to a 7–1 victory. Just as the club seemed to be heading for oblivion, a new committee of "all the football worthies in the town" was formed to take the club forward in a meeting at Burslem town hall that was "packed to suffocation"; Edward Oliver was voted as the new chairman, with Sam Gleaves as the new secretary. In January, a public company was floated with £2,000 capital in £1 shares. On 2 January, Vale recorded their first away win of the campaign, beaten second-bottom Grantham Rovers 1–0. The turn around in form was confirmed with a 2–1 win over champions Kettering. Now in a position to strengthen the team, Vale signed left-sided attacker James Peake from Crewe Alexandra. A 7–2 defeat at Barnsley St Peter's proved to be the one blip in a run of nine unbeaten in the league, with the team grumbling about foul play from the hosts and "incompetence" from the referee. On 20 February, Vale managed to humiliate Grantham Rovers 8–0.

Supporters returned to the Athletic Ground and a crowd of 1,500 witnessed a 3–1 victory over Long Eaton Rangers on 6 March. Two away victories saw the club rise to fourth in the league, including a 1–0 win at Rushden in which Fred Belfield was "advised to leave the field" by the referee as the home crowd were threatening to rush the pitch in response to Belfield's repeated kicking of defender Minney. More crowd trouble also occurred in the 1–0 win at Doncaster Rovers, as Dick Evans was grabbed by the throat and Teddy Morse was "hurled under the waggonette". Morse was sent off in the following game, a 1–0 home defeat by Ilkeston Town, after Willett claimed he had bitten his nose. Vale went on to win their final two home fixtures, ending the campaign in seventh-place with 31 points from 28 matches, just one point away from third-place. Dick Evans finished as the club's top-scorer, claiming 12 league goals – though some of these might actually have been scored by namesake Ted Evans. The team's form in 1897 saw the club given a vote on whether they should be readmitted into the Football League at the league's annual meeting; however their 11 votes were two fewer than successful applicants Luton Town.

Cup competitions
Vale claimed a walkover victory over Hereford in the third qualification round of the FA Cup after they could not guarantee the visitor's expenses. They then beat Birmingham League side Stourbridge in the next round, but failed to overcome Football League Second Division side Burton Swifts in the fifth qualification round in what was described as "the best game seen at Cobridge for two years". They exited the Birmingham Senior Cup at the first round, losing 2–1 to Brierley Hill Alliance. They failed to make it past the preliminary round of the Staffordshire Senior Cup, falling to a 4–2 defeat at Dresden United in a replayed fixture after the initial match was tied 1–1. In the Wellingborough Cup, Vale beat Football League Second Division side Walsall 3–2 at Fellows Park, but then lost 3–1 at Wellingborough Town in the semi-finals. On 28 April, Vale claimed the Staffordshire Senior Charity Cup after beating Dresden United 3–0.

Results
Burslem Port Vale's score comes first

Legend

Midland League

FA Cup

Birmingham Senior Cup

Staffordshire Senior Cup

Wellingborough Cup

Staffordshire Senior Charity Cup

Player statistics

Appearances

Top scorers

Transfers

Transfers in

Transfers out

References
Specific

General

Port Vale F.C. seasons
Burslem Port Vale